The 1956 New Mexico A&M Aggies football team was an American football team that represented New Mexico College of Agriculture and Mechanical Arts (now known as New Mexico State University) as a member of the Border Conference during the 1956 NCAA University Division football season.  In their second year under head coach Tony Cavallo, the Aggies compiled a 1–9 record (0–4 against conference opponents), finished last in the conference, and were outscored by a total of 276 to 131. The team played its home games at Memorial Stadium.

Schedule

References

New Mexico AandM
New Mexico State Aggies football seasons
New Mexico AandM Aggies football